Paolo Leoni (died 1590) was a Roman Catholic prelate who served as Bishop of Ferrara (1578–1590).

Biography
On 17 March 1578, Paolo Leoni was appointed during the papacy of Pope Gregory XIII as Bishop of Ferrara.
On 4 May 1578, he was consecrated bishop by Giulio Canani, Bishop of Adria, with Ercole Sacrati, Bishop of Comacchio, and Sisto Visdomini, Bishop of Modena, serving as co-consecrators. 
He served as Bishop of Ferrara until his death on 7 August 1590.

References

External links and additional sources
 (for Chronology of Bishops) 
 (for Chronology of Bishops) 

16th-century Italian Roman Catholic bishops
Bishops appointed by Pope Gregory XIII
1590 deaths